"Stranded" is a song by American singer Lutricia McNeal, released as the third single from her debut album, My Side of Town (1997), in May 1998. It peaked within the top 10 in Austria, Hungary, Ireland, Norway, Sweden, and the United Kingdom. In the latter, it reached number three on both the UK Singles Chart and the UK R&B Chart. On the Eurochart Hot 100, it peaked at number 10 in June 1998. Outside Europe, the single was a top-three hit in New Zealand and also peaked at number six on the US Billboard Hot Dance Club Play chart.

Critical reception
Larry Flick from Billboard wrote, "Led by a cool, contemporary beat, "Stranded" is one -minute hook that couldn't sound more inviting as a mature-sounding uptempo cut for the summer. A funked-up, bass-heavy R&B edit should ensure spins at stations that lean to crossover, while the kicking Hothead T' Edit provides a perfect entree for dance-happy outlets." Adrian Thrills from Daily Mail described it as "sassy", noting that it's "mixing the soulful swagger of Donna Summer with a flapper-girl elegance reminiscent of the Pointer Sisters". A reviewer from Sunday Mirror commented, "Smart Swede follows up Ain't That Just The Way with another singalong cocktail bar anthem. Nice." Paul Sexton from The Times viewed it as "another piece of swaying, summer-weight soul that commercial radio programmers can't get enough of."

Music video
The accompanying music video for "Stranded" was directed by Stuart Gosling and first aired in May 1998. He also directed the music video for "My Side of Town".

Track listings
 CD single, UK (1998)
 "Stranded" (radio edit) – 3:29
 "Stranded" (Steve Antony Hip Hop club mix) – 5:33
 "Stranded" (C&J Remix) – 3:40
 "Stranded" (Baffled club mix) – 6:31
 "Stranded" (Baffled dub mix) – 6:28 

 CD maxi, Europe (1998)
 "Stranded" (original version) – 3:34
 "Stranded" (Steve Antony R&B) – 3:59
 "Stranded" (Baffled remix) – 6:27
 "Stranded" (Magestic 12 Sci Funk remix) – 6:41
 "Stranded" (Baffled dub mix) – 6:28
 "Stranded" (extended version) – 5:10

 CD maxi, US (1999)
 "Stranded" (radio edit) – 3:35
 "Stranded" (Nu Soul 7-inch remix) – 3:55
 "Stranded" (Hothead 7-inch edit) – 3:25
 "Stranded" (Calle & Mauro's Freestyle radio mix) – 3:13
 "Stranded" (Hothead extended remix) – 8:27
 "Stranded" (E-Smoove's Late Night Stomp) – 7:14

Charts

Weekly charts

Year-end charts

Certifications

Release history

References

1998 singles
1998 songs
Dance-pop songs
Epic Records singles
Music videos directed by Stuart Gosling
Song recordings produced by Rami Yacoub
Songs written by Rami Yacoub